Mohamed Serir (born December 6, 1984 in Algiers) is an amateur Algerian Greco-Roman wrestler, who played for the men's welterweight category. He won two medals (gold and silver) for his division at the African Wrestling Championships (2008 in Tunis, Tunisia, and 2009 in Casablanca, Morocco).

Serir made his official debut for the 2008 Summer Olympics in Beijing, where he competed for the men's 66 kg class. He received a bye for the preliminary round of sixteen match, before losing out to Russia's Sergey Kovalenko, who was able to score six points each in two straight periods, leaving Serir without a single point.

At the 2012 Summer Olympics in London, Serir lost the qualifying round match to Lithuania's Edgaras Venckaitis, with a three-set technical score (0–5, 1–0, 0–1), and a classification point score of 1–3.

References

External links
NBC Olympics Profile
 

Algerian male sport wrestlers
1984 births
Living people
Olympic wrestlers of Algeria
Wrestlers at the 2008 Summer Olympics
Wrestlers at the 2012 Summer Olympics
People from Algiers
21st-century Algerian people
20th-century Algerian people